Toulouse Institute of Technology (also called National Polytechnic Institute of Toulouse or INPT) is a French university cluster based in Toulouse, France, part of University of Toulouse. It was founded in 1969. The institute is composed of seven schools (six engineering schools and one school of veterinary medicine) and 17 research laboratories. The institute delivers master's degrees and Ph.D. It is a member of Institut au service du spatial, de ses applications et technologies.

Composition
The seven schools of the institute are:

Engineering schools
École Nationale Supérieure d'Électronique, d'Électrotechnique, d'Informatique, d'Hydraulique et des Télécommunications (ENSEEIHT)
École nationale supérieure des ingénieurs en arts chimiques et technologiques (ENSIACET)
École Nationale Supérieure Agronomique de Toulouse (ENSAT)
École nationale d'ingénieurs de Tarbes (ENIT)
École d'ingénieurs de Purpan (EIP)
École Nationale de la Météorologie (ENM)

School of veterinary medicine
École nationale vétérinaire de Toulouse (ENVT)

Notes and references

External links 
 National Polytechnic Institute of Toulouse
 INP-ENSAT
 INP-ENSEEIHT
 INP-ENSIACET
 INP-ENIT
 INP-ENM

University of Toulouse
Technical universities and colleges in France
Universities and colleges in Toulouse
Educational institutions established in 1969
1969 establishments in France